George W. Wallace was an American college football player and coach. He was the second head football coach at Fordham University, serveing for one season, in 1885, and compiling a record of 0–3.

Head coaching record

References

Year of birth missing
Year of death missing
19th-century players of American football
Fordham Rams football coaches
Fordham Rams football players